Nelson Erazo (29 July 1959 – 23 March 2017) was a male track and field athlete from Puerto Rico, who competed in the men's 100 metres and 200 metres during his career. He set his personal best (20.99 s) in the 200 m in 1984. Erazo represented Puerto Rico at the 1984 Summer Olympics, where he was eliminated in the first round (heat ten) of the men's 200 metres, clocking 21.72 s. After his retirement as an athlete he went to teach at various public schools and private schools in the Toa Alta and Bayamón, as a Physical Education teacher.

Public Schools and Private Schools where he worked
Academia Cristiana Yarah, Toa Alta P.R.
Escuela Superior Miguel De Cervantes Saavedra, Bayamón P.R.

References
 sports-reference

1959 births
2017 deaths
Olympic track and field athletes of Puerto Rico
Athletes (track and field) at the 1984 Summer Olympics
Puerto Rican male sprinters